Hallquist may refer to:
Barbara Hallquist (born 1957), American tennis player
Christine Hallquist (born 1956), American politician
Stone Hallquist (1902–1981), American football player
Hallquist Lake, lake in Carver County, Minnesota, United States